Evan McEachran (born March 6, 1997) is a Canadian freeskier from Ontario, Canada. He is a member of the Canadian Slopestyle Ski Team. Evan represented Canada in slopestyle at the 2018 Winter Olympics in PyeongChang, where he qualified for the final, along with two fellow Canadian skiers, and finished sixth.

On January 24, 2022, McEachran was named to Canada's 2022 Olympic team.

References

External links
 
 
 
 
 

Canadian male freestyle skiers
1997 births
X Games athletes
Living people
Freestyle skiers at the 2018 Winter Olympics
Freestyle skiers at the 2022 Winter Olympics
Olympic freestyle skiers of Canada
Sportspeople from Oakville, Ontario